Frankia is a genus of nitrogen-fixing bacteria that live in symbiosis with actinorhizal plants, similar to the Rhizobium bacteria found in the root nodules of legumes in the family Fabaceae. Frankia also initiate the forming of root nodules.

This genus was originally named by Jørgen Brunchorst, in 1886 to honor the German biologist Albert Bernhard Frank. Brunchorst considered the organism he had identified to be a filamentous fungus.  redefined the genus in 1970 as containing prokaryotic actinomycetes and created the family Frankiaceae within the Actinomycetales. He retained the original name of Frankia for the genus.

Overview
Most Frankia strains are specific to different plant species. The bacteria are filamentous and convert atmospheric nitrogen into ammonia via the enzyme nitrogenase, a process known as nitrogen fixation. They do this while living in root nodules on actinorhizal plants. The bacteria can supply most or all of the nitrogen requirements of the host plant. As a result, actinorhizal plants colonise and often thrive in soils that are low in plant nutrients.

Several Frankia genomes are now available which may help clarify how the symbiosis between prokaryote and plant evolved, how the environmental and geographical adaptations occurred, the metabolic diversity, and the horizontal gene flow among the symbiotic prokaryotes.

Frankia can resist low concentration of heavy metals such as, Cu, Co, and Zn. Frankia may be an advantage for degraded soil. Degraded soil is known as soil that is heavy metal rich or nutrient depleted due to a drought. Frankia is a nitrogen-fixed organism, explaining why it is able to resist heavy metals.

Frankia is a gram-positive Bacteria that is found on the roots of plants. The fact that Frankia is gram-positive means that the bacteria is made up of thick cell walls made out of protein called peptidologlycan. This helps with the resistance of the heavy metals that may be in the degraded soil.

Frankia tolerates a narrow range of temperatures and soil pH levels. It grows best at around 30 degrees Celsius with an environment pH between 6.5 and 7. These facts shows that Frankia is very sensitive to its environment. Though Frankia would not be suitable for all agriculture it does demonstrate possibilities in select areas, or in temperature controlled environments.

Symbiont plants

 All species in the genus Alnus in the family Betulaceae 
 Some species in all four genera in the family Casuarinaceae
 Certain species in the genus Coriaria in the family Coriariaceae
 Datisca cannabina and Datisca glomerata in the family Datiscaceae
 All species in the three genera in the family Elaeagnaceae, Elaeagnus, Shepherdia, and Hippophae
 All species in the genera Myrica, Morella, and Comptonia in the family Myricaceae.
 All species in six genera in the family Rhamnaceae, Ceanothus, Colletia, Discaria, Trevoa, and possibly Adolphia
 Some species in the family Rosaceae including all the species in the genera Cercocarpus, Cowania, Purshia, Chamaebatia, and some species of Dryas

References

Actinomycetia
Bacteria genera